Streptomyces fimbriatus is a bacterium species from the genus of Streptomyces which has been isolated from soil. Streptomyces fimbriatus produces septacidin and cephamycin B
.

See also 
 List of Streptomyces species

References

Further reading

External links
Type strain of Streptomyces fimbriatus at BacDive -  the Bacterial Diversity Metadatabase

fimbriatus
Bacteria described in 1953